Fionnuala McCormack (née Britton; born 24 September 1984 in Wicklow) is an Irish runner who has competed at a range of distance running events. She was the gold medallist at the 2011 and 2012 European Cross Country Championships. She has represented Ireland in the steeplechase at the 2008 Beijing Olympics and 2012 London Olympics, the 2007 World Championships in Athletics and 2011 World Championships in Athletics, and twice at the European Athletics Championships. In December 2012, Britton became the first woman to successfully defend the European Cross Country Championship.

Career
She began her international junior career in cross country running in 2001, highlighted by 33rd place at the 2003 IAAF World Cross Country Championships. She won a steeplechase silver at the 2006 European Cup and also competed in the event at the European Athletics Championships, being eliminated in the heats. She took the under-23 silver medal at the 2006 European Cross Country Championships at the end of the year. She was fourteenth in the senior race at the 2007 IAAF World Cross Country Championships – the second best European performer behind Jessica Augusto (12th). She made her global track debut at the 2007 World Championships in Athletics and was twelfth in the steeplechase final. She ended the year with a seventh-place finish at the 2007 European Cross Country Championships.

She made her Olympic debut at the 2008 Summer Games in Beijing, but did not make the women's steeplechase final. She came eleventh at the 2009 European Cross Country Championships which was held in her home city of Dublin. Britton was also eleventh in the steeplechase final at the 2010 European Athletics Championships. She just missed out on a medal at the 2010 European Cross Country Championships, finishing with the same time as bronze medallist Ana Dulce Félix. She took second place at the Lotto Cross Cup Brussels a week later.

In preparation for the world competition, she ran at the Almond Blossom Cross Country in March 2011 and took second place. She managed 16th place at the 2011 IAAF World Cross Country Championships in Punta Umbría. She ran a personal best of 15:31.26 minutes for the 5000 metres at the FBK Games in June then ran a steeplechase best of 9:37.60 minutes at the Adidas Grand Prix in New York. Britton represented Ireland on the track at the 2011 World Championships in Athletics, narrowly being eliminated in the first stage of the steeplechase. In November she came third at the high-level Cross de l'Acier cross country race.
In December 2011, she won the gold medal at the 2011 European Cross Country Championships.

She began 2012 with wins at the Great Edinburgh Cross Country and Antrim Cross Country. She expressed her disappointment that the World Cross Country would not be held that year, and stated that she would focus on track running that year instead. In December of that year she became the first woman to defend the continental cross title claiming victory at the 2012 European Cross Country Championships.

In January 2013, Britton retained her Great Edinburgh Cross Country and Antrim Cross Country titles.

On 3 March 2013, she won a bronze medal in the 3000 metres final at the 2013 European Athletics Indoor Championships in Gothenburg. She placed 13th at the 2013 IAAF World Cross Country Championships, being Europe's top performer in the race and one of only two non-Africans in the top 15 (alongside Neely Spence). She competed mainly in European competitions in the following two seasons, coming fourth at the 2013 European Cross Country Championships, ranking eighth in the 10,000 m at the 2014 European Athletics Championships, then ending in sixth at the 2014 European Cross Country Championships (and taking a team bronze).

She married in 2015 and began competing as Fionnuala McCormack. Her first success under her married name was a team bronze at the 2015 European Cross Country Championships, where she narrowly missed an individual medal in fourth place behind Karoline Bjerkeli Grøvdal. She finished 5th in the 2019 Chicago Marathon.

In 2019, she competed in the senior women's race at the 2019 IAAF World Cross Country Championships held in Aarhus, Denmark. She finished in 18th place.

International competitions

Personal bests
1500 metres – 4:08.35 min (2011)
3000 metres – 8:55.12 min (2012)
3000 metres indoor – 8:53.47 min (2013)
5000 metres – 15:08.69 min (2012)
10,000 metres – 31:18.25 min (2012)
3000 metres steeplechase – 9:17.60 min (2011)
Marathon – 2 hrs 23:58 min (2021)

References

External links
 
 
 
 

1984 births
Living people
People from Wicklow (town)
Sportspeople from County Wicklow
Irish female long-distance runners
Irish female steeplechase runners
Athletes (track and field) at the 2008 Summer Olympics
Athletes (track and field) at the 2012 Summer Olympics
Athletes (track and field) at the 2016 Summer Olympics
Athletes (track and field) at the 2020 Summer Olympics
Olympic athletes of Ireland
World Athletics Championships athletes for Ireland
European Cross Country Championships winners
20th-century Irish women
21st-century Irish women